The Church of Universal Triumph, Dominion of God is a predominantly African American  Pentecostal holiness spiritual church. It began as a breakaway congregation of the Detroit branch of the southern based, nationwide Triumph the Church and Kingdom of God in Christ in the 1940s. It was founded by James F. Jones, often known as Prophet Jones.

Universal Triumph, Dominion of God positions itself theologically as the 'fulfillment' of and the true successor to 'the mission' of its former Mother Church. Its self-designation is not as a Christian 'Holiness' Church but as a Christian 'Holiness' Kingdom or a literal 'Dominion of God' into which members, known as 'citizens', have to 'register' not 'join'.

Once registered into the Dominion, citizens are admonished to strictly abide by the 'Dominion rules', i.e. no smoking, alcoholic drinks, coffee, tea, drugs or games of any kind as specified in the 'Dominion constitution' as set up by the 'Dominion Ruler'. The Dominion Ruler is the Head of the Dominion or Kingdom.

Objectives and purposes
The Dominion was founded, it states, by direct message to its founder by God to disseminate the "whole truth of God throughout the world". Thus divine messages of guidance and revelation through the Dominion founder are the underscoring foundation of Universal Triumph Dominion of God. Its sacred text is the Christian Bible.

Dominion publications that interpret and explain the Bible in light of the divine revelations of the Dominion founder, Prophet Jones, are 'The Mind Awakener' and 'The Message'. The procedure to properly conduct weekly Dominion services are in 'The ritual'. Further instructions for citizens and auxiliaries and other components that make up the Dominion of God are in 'The Dominion Constitution'. The Dominion consists of numerous 'churches' called "Thankful Centers" around the United States and abroad.

Hierarchy
The Dominion is led by the Dominion Ruler. The founding Dominion Ruler, James F. Jones, is known to the citizens of the Dominion of God as 'God's only Holy Prophet'. The Dominion Ruler is assisted in his duties by The First Dominion Lady and the Dominion Chief Secretary known as the Universal Dominion Executor. The Universal Dominion Executor presides over the Diocean Administers. The Diocean Administers preside over the various districts, or Diocese, that compose the Dominion. Several Thankful Centers make up a Dominion district. The local Thankful Center is led by a Dominion minister called the Local Administrator. The Local Administrator oversees weekly Dominion services as well as the local activities of the Dominion auxiliary clubs.

General Assembly
An annual international Dominion conference called the 'General Assembly' is convened by the Dominion hierarchy, the board of directors and the board of trustees of the Dominion, to oversee the world activities of Universal Triumph, Dominion of God. The activities and duties of the General Assembly when convened are to review the efforts of the Dominion workers to establish Thankful Centers, Dominion schools and seminaries throughout the world, to ordain and appoint missionaries and evangelists to head up the work and to appoint and ordain all dignitaries and officials of the Dominion under the direct direction and leadership of the Universal Dominion Ruler.

Clergy and auxiliary leaders
The Dominion clergy, workers and auxiliary leaders make up the dignitaries and officials of Universal Triumph, Dominion of God. Both men and women citizens in the Dominion are eligible to serve as auxiliary club and/or laity leaders as well as members of the clergy. Leaders in the work of the Dominion earn and are given royal titles such as sir, prince, princess, lord, and lady by designation from the Dominion Ruler.

Dominion auxiliary clubs
The auxiliary clubs of Universal Triumph, Dominion of God are the Universal Missionary Society, the Universal Praise Bands, the Universal Rescue Workers and the Universal Young Peoples Union. The Universal Missionary Society's duties include establishing thankful centers, Universal Triumph, Dominion of God schools and seminaries throughout the world. The Universal Rescue Workers Union's duties are "to provide for the widows and orphans, the poor and the needy". The Universal Young Peoples Union is the youth auxiliary of the Dominion.

Founding prophet, teachings and celebrations

The Dominion was organized and founded in Detroit, Michigan in 1944 by a former Pastor & missionary for Triumph the Church and Kingdom of God in Christ, James F. Jones. Jones, known as "Prophet Jones", claimed to be a faith healing minister, and ran a fundamentalist Christian, radio and television ministry. Jones further claimed that he was the second coming of Christ with the divine power to heal, forecast, bless and curse.

Jones, as Dominion founder, was the Dominion Ruler from 1944 till his death in 1971. His successor as Dominion Ruler was James Schaffer.

The Universal Triumph Dominion of God's teachings revolve around heralding the incoming millennial rule of 'perfect bliss' under the 'universal triumph' of the 'kingdom of God', in which the wicked, and death itself, will be destroyed but the Dominion faithful will live forever in incorruptible physical bodies right here on Earth. Those in the Dominion that are faithful now, it teaches, can and do have heaven right here on earth by recognizing the 'divine' calling of the Dominion ruler and by strictly obeying his 'divine' wisdom and rules. When this stage of understanding is adhered too the Dominion declares "All Is well": which is the Dominion's signature phrase.

The Dominion of God holds its founder and first Dominion Ruler, Jones, in the highest esteem. It annually celebrates the week of his birth, beginning November 24, his birthday, called Philamethyu and ending December 1, called Hushdomcalama. For the Dominion this is the sacred time of the year and the celebrations take the place of Christmas as practiced in much of Christianity.

Dominion rulers

The Dominion Ruler in the Church of Universal Triumph, Dominion of God is the head religious leader, pastor, and overseer of the church and movement. The Dominion Ruler (the Head of the Dominion, or colloquially, the Kingdom) is understood by the Dominion citizens to be the Universal Divine Ruler similar to a divine king who is in direct contact with God.

Duties
The Dominion Ruler serves as top leader, chief teacher, top trustee and final judge as the 'divine ruler' in the Church of Universal Triumph, Dominion of God. He oversees the international Dominion conference called the General Assembly convened by the Dominion hierarchy, the board of directors and the board of trustees. He also awards high-level and active leaders in the Dominion  with royal titles such as sir, prince, princess, lord and lady.

Honorary titles
His Holiness
The Right Reverend
Reverend Lord, Lord comes from how Prophet Jones  blessed his inner circle with royal and noble titles, such as "Sir," "Prince" and "Princess," "Lord" and "Lady" and other majestic appellations.

List of Dominion rulers

References

Sources
 
 

Spiritual organizations
Pentecostal denominations
Christian denominations established in the 20th century
Christian organizations established in 1944
Historically African-American Christian denominations
Churches in Detroit
Holiness denominations